Macrobathra is a genus of moths in the family Cosmopterigidae. Most species are endemic to Australia.

Species
Macrobathra allocrana Turner, 1916
Macrobathra allophyla (Turner, 1944)
Macrobathra alternatella (Walker, 1864)
Macrobathra anacampta Meyrick, 1914
Macrobathra anemarcha Meyrick, 1886
Macrobathra anemodes Meyrick, 1886
Macrobathra aneurae Turner, 1932
Macrobathra anisodora Meyrick, 1924
Macrobathra antimeloda Meyrick, 1930
Macrobathra aphristis Meyrick, 1889
Macrobathra arneutis 
Macrobathra arrectella (Walker, 1864)
Macrobathra asemanta Lower, 1894
Macrobathra astrota Meyrick, 1914
Macrobathra auratella Viette, 1958
Macrobathra baliomitra Turner, 1932
Macrobathra basisticha (Turner, 1936)
Macrobathra bigerella (Walker, 1864)
Macrobathra brontodes Meyrick, 1886
Macrobathra callipetala Turner, 1932
Macrobathra callispila Turner, 1916
Macrobathra ceraunobola Meyrick, 1886
Macrobathra chryseostola Turner, 1932
Macrobathra chrysospila Meyrick, 1886
Macrobathra chrysotoxa Meyrick, 1886
Macrobathra cineralella 
Macrobathra constrictella (Walker, 1864)
Macrobathra crococephala Meyrick, 1936
Macrobathra crococosma Meyrick, 1922
Macrobathra dasyplaca Lower, 1894
Macrobathra decataea Meyrick, 1914
Macrobathra deltozona 
Macrobathra desmotoma Meyrick, 1886
Macrobathra diplochrysa Lower, 1894
Macrobathra dispila Turner, 1932
Macrobathra distincta (Walsingham, 1891)
Macrobathra drosera Lower, 1901
Macrobathra embroneta Turner, 1932
Macrobathra epimela (Lower, 1894)
Macrobathra equestris 
Macrobathra erythrocephala (Lower, 1904)
Macrobathra eudesma Lower, 1900
Macrobathra euryleuca Meyrick, 1886
Macrobathra euryxantha Meyrick, 1886
Macrobathra euspila Turner, 1932
Macrobathra fasciata (Walsingham, 1891)
Macrobathra flavidus F.J. Qian & Y.Q. Liu, 1997
Macrobathra galenaea Meyrick, 1902
Macrobathra gastroleuca Lower, 1905
Macrobathra gentilis 
Macrobathra hamata 
Macrobathra hamaxitodes Meyrick, 1886
Macrobathra harmostis Meyrick, 1889
Macrobathra hedrastis 
Macrobathra heminephela Meyrick, 1886
Macrobathra hemitropa Meyrick, 1886
Macrobathra heterocera Lower, 1894
Macrobathra heterozona Meyrick, 1889
Macrobathra hexadyas Meyrick, 1906
Macrobathra homocosma Meyrick, 1902
Macrobathra honoratella (Walker, 1864)
Macrobathra humilis (Turner, 1933)
Macrobathra hyalistis Meyrick, 1889
Macrobathra isoscelana Lower, 1893
Macrobathra latipterophora H.H. Li & X.P. Wang, 2004
Macrobathra leucopeda Meyrick, 1886
Macrobathra leucozancla Turner, 1932
Macrobathra lychnophora Turner, 1932
Macrobathra melanargyra Meyrick, 1886
Macrobathra melanomitra Meyrick, 1886
Macrobathra melanota Meyrick, 1886
Macrobathra mesopora Meyrick, 1886
Macrobathra metallica 
Macrobathra micropis Lower, 1894
Macrobathra microspora Lower, 1900
Macrobathra monoclina 
Macrobathra monostadia Meyrick, 1886
Macrobathra myriophthalma Meyrick, 1886
Macrobathra myrocoma 
Macrobathra nephelomorpha Meyrick, 1886
Macrobathra neurocoma 
Macrobathra nimbifera Turner, 1932
Macrobathra niphadobola Meyrick, 1886
Macrobathra nomaea 
Macrobathra notomitra 
Macrobathra notozyga Meyrick, 1914
Macrobathra ochanota 
Macrobathra paracentra Lower, 1893
Macrobathra parthenistis Meyrick, 1889
Macrobathra peraeota Meyrick, 1921
Macrobathra petalitis 
Macrobathra phernaea Lower, 1899
Macrobathra philopsamma Lower, 1900
Macrobathra phryganina Turner, 1932
Macrobathra platychroa Lower, 1897
Macrobathra platyzona Turner, 1932
Macrobathra polypasta Turner, 1932
Macrobathra pompholyctis Meyrick, 1889
Macrobathra porphyrea Meyrick, 1886
Macrobathra proxena Meyrick, 1914
Macrobathra psathyrodes Turner, 1932
Macrobathra pyrodoxa 
Macrobathra quercea Moriuti, 1973
Macrobathra recrepans Meyrick, 1926
Macrobathra rhodospila Meyrick, 1886
Macrobathra rhythmodes Turner, 1916
Macrobathra rubicundella (Walker, 1864)
Macrobathra sarcoleuca Meyrick, 1915
Macrobathra sikoraella 	(Viette, 1956)
Macrobathra stenosema Turner, 1932
Macrobathra subharpalea (Legrand, 1966)
Macrobathra superharpalea (Legrand, 1966)
Macrobathra synacta Meyrick, 1920
Macrobathra synastra Meyrick, 1886
Macrobathra syncoma Lower, 1899
Macrobathra trimorpha Meyrick, 1889
Macrobathra trithyra Meyrick, 1886
Macrobathra vexillariata Lucas, 1901
Macrobathra vividella (R. Felder & Rogenhofer, 1875)
Macrobathra xanthoplaca Meyrick, 1902
Macrobathra xuthocoma Meyrick, 1886
Macrobathra xylopterella (Walker, 1864)
Macrobathra zonodesma Lower, 1900

Selected former species
Macrobathra centrophena 
Macrobathra cirrhodora Meyrick, 1915
Macrobathra definitiva 
Macrobathra lunacrescens 
Macrobathra monoxantha

References

 , 2004: A study of Macrobathra Meyrick from China (Lepidoptera: Cosmopterigidae). Acta Zootaxonomica Sinica 29 (1): 147-152.
 , 1973: A new genus and two new species of the Japanese Microlepidoptera (Timyridae and Oecophoridae). Tyô to Ga 23 (2): 31-38. Full article: .
 , 1997: A new species of the oecophorids injurious to the cone and seed of China fir. (Lepidoptera: Oecophoridae). Scientia Silvae Sinicae 33 (1): 66-68. Full article: .

External links
Natural History Museum Lepidoptera genus database

 
Cosmopteriginae
Taxa named by Edward Meyrick
Moth genera